Thomas Sutherland (May 3, 1931 – July 22, 2016), Dean of Agriculture at the American University of Beirut in Lebanon, was kidnapped by Islamic Jihad members near his Beirut home on June 9, 1985. He was released on November 18, 1991 at the same time as Terry Waite, having been held hostage for 2,353 days.

Early life and kidnapping
Born in Falkirk, Scotland on May 3, 1931, Sutherland was signed as a 17-year-old by Rangers F.C. Sutherland obtained a BSc in Agriculture from the University of Glasgow, and moved to the United States in the 1950s. He received a master's degree and PhD in animal breeding from Iowa State University, then taught animal science at Colorado State University for 26 years. He moved to Beirut in 1983 for a three-year term as dean of the faculty of agriculture and food science in the American University in Beirut. Despite the assassination of University President Malcolm H. Kerr and the kidnapping of Professor Frank Reiger in 1984, and despite being warned repeatedly by the State Department to leave, Sutherland remained at the University. Two weeks after David P. Jacobsen was abducted, Sutherland was also kidnapped while using the limousine of University President Calvin Plimpton. Upon his release, Sutherland claimed that the kidnappers mistook him for Plimpton.

Aftermath
He was the second-longest held captive after Terry Anderson. His memories of the experience were published in a book co-authored by his wife Jean, At Your Own Risk. He claims to have attempted suicide a number of times and to have spent a substantial amount of time in solitary confinement.

In June 2001, the Sutherland family won a $323 million verdict in a lawsuit against the frozen assets of the government of Iran, because of evidence that Iran had directed terrorists to kidnap Americans in Lebanon. In accordance with Section 2002 of the Victims of Trafficking and Violence Protection Act of 2000, Sutherland and his family received $35,041,877.36 (including interest) and the lien for the rest of the original settlement is now held by the US Government.

Sutherland died on July 22, 2016 in Fort Collins, Colorado, aged 85.

See also
Lebanon hostage crisis
List of kidnappings
List of solved missing person cases

References

1931 births
1980s missing person cases
2016 deaths
American people taken hostage
Academic staff of the American University of Beirut
Alumni of the University of Glasgow
Formerly missing people
Iowa State University alumni
Colorado State University faculty
Kidnappings by Islamists
Kidnappings in Lebanon
Missing person cases in Lebanon